Karen Atkinson may refer to:

 Karen Atkinson (netball) (born 1978), English international netball player
 Karen Atkinson (camogie) (born 1986), Irish camogie player